The Philadelphia Herpetological Society (PHS) is the oldest, continually operated reptile group in North America. It was founded by Roger Conant (herpetologist) and a group of like-minded herpetologists in 1952. PHS is a US 501(c)3 non-profit educational organization. The current president is Mark Miller.

PHS has published the Bulletin and occasional newsletters throughout its history.
 
They seem to meet infrequently at present but operate a reptile rescue in the Philadelphia metro area, and own and operate a wildlife conservation area in Burlington, New Jersey.

External links
 Official Website
 Facebook Page

Herpetology organizations
Scientific societies based in the United States
Herpetological Society
Scientific organizations established in 1952
1952 establishments in Pennsylvania